Mostadmark Chapel is a parish church of the Church of Norway in Malvik municipality in Trøndelag county, Norway. It is located in the village of Sneisen in the rural Mostadmarka area of southern Malvik. It one of the churches for the Hommelvik parish which is part of the Stjørdal prosti (deanery) in the Diocese of Nidaros. The red, wooden chapel was built in a long church style in 1986 by the architectural firm Risan & Risan. The chapel seats about 120 people. 

The church was consecrated on 15 June 1986 by Bishop Kristen Kyrre Bremer.

See also
List of churches in Nidaros

References

Malvik
Churches in Trøndelag
Long churches in Norway
Wooden churches in Norway
20th-century Church of Norway church buildings
Churches completed in 1986
1986 establishments in Norway